Tillandsia durangensis is a species of flowering plant in the genus Tillandsia. This species is endemic to Mexico.

Cultivars
 Tillandsia 'Panuco'

References

BSI Cultivar Registry Retrieved 11 October 2009

durangensis
Endemic flora of Mexico
Plants described in 1983